"J'ai fait tout ça pour vous" is a song performed by French singer Mélissa Nkonda featuring vocals from English singer V V Brown. It was released in France on 1 August 2011. It has peaked to number 65 on the French Singles Chart.

Music video
A music video to accompany the release of "J'ai Fait Tout Ca Pour Vous" was first released onto YouTube on 17 July 2011 at a total length of two minutes and forty-eight seconds.

Track listing

Credits and personnel
Lead vocals – Melissa Nkonda and V V Brown
Producers – Yorgos Benardos, Mounir Maarouf
Lyrics – Niara Scarlett, Blair Mackichan, Mounir Maarouf, V.V. Brown, Melissa NKonda
Label: AZ

Chart performance

References

2011 singles
Songs written by Blair MacKichan
Songs written by V V Brown
Songs written by Niara Scarlett
2011 songs